Limenitis austenia (the grey commodore) is a species of nymphalid butterfly found in Asia, ranging from Assam to northern Burma.

Taxonomy
This species has been treated under the genus names of Bhagadatta and Lebadea in the past.

Subspecies
Limenitis austenia austenia 
Limenitis austenia violetta Miyata & Yoshida, 1995

References

Limenitis
Taxa named by Frederic Moore
Butterflies described in 1872
Butterflies of Asia